11 Ursae Minoris is a single star located approximately 410 light years away in the northern circumpolar constellation of Ursa Minor. The star is visible to the naked eye as a faint, orange-hued star with an apparent visual magnitude of 5.15. It is moving closer to the Earth with a heliocentric radial velocity of −17.5 km/s.

This is an aging K-type giant star with a stellar classification of K4 III. It is 1.2 billion years old with twice the mass of the Sun. As a consequence of exhausting the hydrogen at its core, the star has expanded to 28 times the Sun's radius. It is radiating 258 times the luminosity of the Sun from its swollen photosphere at an effective temperature of 4,358 K.

11 Ursae Minoris is sometimes named Pherkard or Pherkad Minor, the later name to distinguish it from Pherkad (Major) which is γ Ursae minoris. It has also been designated as γ1 Ursae minoris, in which case the brighter Pherkad is called γ2 Ursae minoris, but these names are rarely used. 11 Ursae Minoris is the Flamsteed designation.

11 Ursae minoris has a detected planet discovered in August 2009.

Planetary system
11 Ursae minoris b was discovered during a radial velocity survey of 62 K type Red giant stars using the 2m Alfred Jensch telescope of the Thuringian State Observatory in Germany.

See also
 HD 32518
 Lists of exoplanets

References

External links
 

K-type giants
Planetary systems with one confirmed planet
Ursa Minor (constellation)
BD+72 0678
Ursae Minoris, 11
136726
074793
5714